DXVL (94.9 FM), broadcasting as 94.9 Kool FM, is a radio station owned and operated by the Government of Kabacan. The station's studio and transmitter are located at the College of Arts and Sciences Building, USM Ave., Kabacan.

References

Radio stations in Cotabato